The 1905–06 season was the third competitive season in the history of Plymouth Argyle Football Club.

References
General

Specific

External links
Plymouth Argyle F.C. official website
Plymouth Argyle F.C. archive

1905-06
English football clubs 1905–06 season